Benjamin Ebenezer Obomanu (born October 30, 1983) is a former American football wide receiver. He was selected by the Seattle Seahawks in the 7th round of the 2006 NFL Draft. Obomanu played college football for the Auburn Tigers.

High school
Obomanu attended Selma High School in Selma, Alabama, and was a letterman and a starter in football and basketball. He graduated from Selma High School as a valedictorian.

College career 
Obomanu played football for Auburn from 2002-05. He had a career game against Ole MIss in 2003 but dropped the game winning touchdown pass in the end zone in a loss.

Obomanu is a member of the Sigma Delta chapter (Auburn University) of Omega Psi Phi fraternity. He attended the University of Alabama School of Law beginning in Fall 2015.

College statistics

Professional career

After being drafted by the Seattle Seahawks in the seventh round (249th overall) of the 2006 NFL Draft, Obomanu spent the entire 2006 season on the team's practice squad.

Obomanu made the Seahawks' active roster out of training camp in 2007. His first NFL touchdown came in on October 14 in a Sunday Night Football game against the New Orleans Saints. Obomanu caught a 17-yard Matt Hasselbeck pass late in the second quarter.

Obomanu broke his collarbone in a preseason game against the Oakland Raiders on the 29th of August 2008 and he was placed on Injured Reserve the following day.

Following Week 11 of the 2010 NFL Season, Obomanu was promoted to the #2 receiver, starting alongside Mike Williams.

In a home game against the Carolina Panthers in 2010, Obomanu was injured as a result of a hit by Panthers safety Charles Godfrey.

Obomanu finished the 2010 season with 30 receptions for 494 yards, 4 touchdowns, and a 16.5 yard per catch average.
Shortly after the Seahawks' were eliminated from the playoffs against the Bears, Obomanu signed a new 3-year contract with the Seahawks running through 2013.

On March 15, 2013, the Seahawks released Obomanu.

New York Jets

Obomanu was signed by the New York Jets on May 30, 2013. He was released on August 31, 2013. He was re-signed on September 10, 2013. He was released on October 2, 2013.

Career statistics

Law school
In the Fall of 2015, Obomanu enrolled in law school at The University of Alabama School of Law. During his third-year, Obomanu served as the President of the Black Law Students Association and as the Student Ombudsperson for the Honor Council.

References

External links

New York Jets bio 
Auburn Tigers bio

1983 births
Living people
American football wide receivers
African-American players of American football
Auburn Tigers football players
Players of American football from Alabama
Sportspeople from Selma, Alabama
Seattle Seahawks players
New York Jets players
21st-century African-American sportspeople
20th-century African-American people